Facundo Gómez Bruera (born April 29, 1978), best known by his stage name Facundo, is a Mexican TV host among Mexican teenagers.

Biography 

Facundo started his career at the Mexican TV network TeleHit together with his good friend Diego, hosting a show called Depasónico, where, besides presenting videos, the two conducted interviews and visited nightclubs.

In April 2002 Gómez launched a new show called Toma Libre, where Changoleon becomes famous.

Facundo also took part in Mexico's Big Brother VIP where he finished in second place. His fans called him "the uncrowned king".

In 2004 he hosted a new show Incógnito which had a similar format to that of Toma Libre. It was transmitted by Televisa's Canal 5.

References 

Mexican television personalities
Mexican male television actors
Mexican male comedians
Mexican people of Argentine descent
Male actors from Mexico City
Comedians from Mexico City
1978 births
Living people
Big Brother (franchise) contestants